The 1989 Labatt Brier, the Canadian men's curling championship, was held from March 5 to 12 at the Saskatchewan Place in Saskatoon, Saskatchewan.

Pat Ryan of Alberta defeated Rick Folk of British Columbia to win his second Brier.

"The Ryan Express"
Pat Ryan's team was well known for its hitting style. Once they got the lead, the team would just peel off every opposition stone to win the game. This defensive strategy was heavily criticized for being boring. Whenever Ryan switched to this style of play, fans began shouting "bor-ing". However, the strategy worked for Ryan, who won the Brier. The score of the final game (3–2), remains the lowest total score for a final game in Brier history. This caused the implementation of the free guard zone a few years later to cause more offence in the game.

Howard loses his voice
Also of note at the 1989 Brier was Ontario skip Russ Howard's loss of his voice. Howard was nicknamed "the Wounded Moose" for the way he screamed in the first few draws of the event. However, he would lose his voice by Tuesday, and could barely speak. So, the team opted to use Walkie-talkies to communicate with their skip. This went unnoticed until their walkie-talkie signals jammed the official's walkie-talkie signals. The Canadian Curling Association (CCA) was quite upset about the matter, but Howard pointed out there was nothing in the rules against their usage, and insisted on continuing to use the walkie-talkies. So, the CCA decided midway through the event to ban the use of walkie-talkies, marking the first time that the rules had been changed in the middle of a tournament.

Teams

Round-robin standings

Round-robin results

Draw 1

Draw 2

Draw 3

Draw 4

Draw 5

Draw 6

Draw 7

Draw 8

Draw 9

Draw 10

Draw 11

Draw 12

Draw 13

Draw 14

Draw 15

Playoffs

Semifinal

Final

Statistics

Top 5 player percentages
Round Robin only

Team percentages
Round Robin only

References

Curling in Saskatoon
1989
1989 in Canadian curling
1989 in Saskatchewan
March 1989 sports events in Canada